The Mercedes-Benz OM364 is a 4.0 liter (3,972cc) Inline-four engine (I4) Overhead valve (OHV) diesel engine with 2 valves per cylinder. It is related to the Straight-six engine OM366 engine which has two extra cylinders, while the bore and stroke remain unchanged.

It launched in 1983 and was first utilized in the Mercedes-Benz LK followed by the second generation Mercedes-Benz T2. Other applications include the MB-trac, the Mercedes-Benz MB800 and industrial engines. MTU Friedrichshafen sold the engine under the ??? label. The engine had a Direct injection system (inline fuel pump) to deliver fuel to every cylinder. Naturally aspirated and turbocharged versions with and without intercooler existed. Only the turbocharged and intercooled version became EURO II capable from 1994 onwards. A twin-scroll turbocharger was utilized giving ~0.9-1atm of boost.

See also 
 List of Mercedes-Benz engines

References 

OM364